A House Not Meant to Stand is the last play written by Tennessee Williams. It was produced during the 1981–82 season at the Goodman Theatre in Chicago by Gregory Mosher and published for the first time in 2008 by New Directions. with a foreword by Gregory Mosher and an Introduction by Thomas Keith.

Plot 
Subtitled A Gothic Comedy, the play is set during the Christmas holiday in the deteriorating Pascagoula, Mississippi house of Cornelius and Bella McCorkle, who have just buried their eldest son, a gay man Cornelius banished from the home years earlier. During a raging storm, heavy drinker Cornelius, who once had political aspirations, tries to get Bella, who suffers from mild dementia, to disclose where she concealed the considerable amount of money she inherited from her grandfather, who accumulated his wealth by making and selling moonshine. When she refuses to cooperate, her husband threatens to have her institutionalized, just as he did their daughter Joanie. Coming to her rescue is their negligent youngest son Charlie, who has returned home with his zealously religious pregnant fiancée Stacey in tow.

History 
The play is derived from a one-act titled Some Problems for the Moose Lodge (published in 2011 in The Magic Tower & Other One-Act Plays) that was staged—together with A Perfect Analysis Given by a Parrot and The Frosted Glass Coffin—under the umbrella title Tennessee Laughs by the Goodman Theatre in 1980. Director Gary Tucker and Goodman artistic director Gregory Mosher urged Williams to expand it into a full-length play. The playwright returned to his home in Key West and began working on what was now called A House Not Meant to Stand, a title suggested by a production assistant on Tennessee Laughs. Williams called it a "Southern Gothic spook sonata," a deliberate reference to an August Strindberg play known as The Ghost Sonata in its English translation. The crumbling house was a metaphor for contemporary society, while the characters were drawn from the Williams family, notably his father Cornelius, his aunt Belle, his paternal grandfather, and his brother Dakin. The play opened in late April 1982 at the Goodman, where it did respectable business through the end of May. Time, calling it "a rich collection of scarred characters," said it was the best play Williams had written in a decade.

Further reading

References 

1982 plays
Plays by Tennessee Williams
Plays set in Mississippi
New Directions Publishing books